Buynaksky District  is an administrative and municipal district (raion), one of the forty-one in the Republic of Dagestan, Russia. It is located in the center of the republic. Its administrative center is the town of Buynaksk (which is not administratively a part of the district). As of the 2010 Census, the total population of the district was 73,402.

Administrative and municipal status
Within the framework of administrative divisions, Buynaksky District is one of the forty-one in the republic. It is divided into nine selsoviets, comprising thirty rural localities. The town of Buynaksk serves as its administrative center, despite being incorporated separately as an administrative unit with the status equal to that of the districts.

As a municipal division, the district is incorporated as Buynaksky Municipal District. Its nine selsoviets are incorporated as twenty rural settlements within the municipal district. The Town of Buynaksk is incorporated separately from the district as Buynaksk Urban Okrug, but serves as the administrative center of the municipal district as well.

References

Notes

Sources

Districts of Dagestan
